Gülcan Mıngır (born 21 May 1989) is a Turkish female middle distance runner specialized in 3000 m steeplechase. She was a member of Fenerbahçe Athletics Club before she transferred to Üsküdar Belediyespor. She is coached by İhsan Alptekin.
.

Currently, Mıngır is a student of physical education and sports at Dumlupınar University in Kütahya.

She was the gold medalist of the 3000 m steeplechase event at the 2011 European Athletics U23 Championships held in Ostrava, Czech Republic.

Mıngır qualified to participate at the 2012 Summer Olympics.

At the 2013 Mediterranean Games held in Mersin, Turkey, she won the bronze medal in the 3000 m st event.

In April 2020, retests of the samples taken from the 2012 Olympics indicated that Mıngır had tested positive for turinabol. The IOC Disciplinary Commission disqualified Mıngır from the 2012 Olympic Games.

Achievements

See also
 Turkish women in sports

References

External links
IAAF profile for Gülcan Mıngır

1989 births
People from İhsaniye
Living people
Turkish female middle-distance runners
Doping cases in athletics
Turkish sportspeople in doping cases
Fenerbahçe athletes
Turkish female steeplechase runners
Olympic athletes of Turkey
Athletes (track and field) at the 2012 Summer Olympics
European Athletics Championships medalists
European champions for Turkey
Mediterranean Games bronze medalists for Turkey
Athletes (track and field) at the 2013 Mediterranean Games
Mediterranean Games medalists in athletics
21st-century Turkish sportswomen
20th-century Turkish sportswomen